Destination is the second studio album from Irish singer-songwriter Ronan Keating. It was released by Polydor Records on 20 May 2002. The album debuted at number one on the UK Albums Chart and was certified two-times platinum by the British Phonographic Industry. In Ireland, the album debuted at number three. Additionally, the album charted within the top ten of nine other European countries. In 2002, Destination was certified platinum by the International Federation of the Phonographic Industry for shipments of one million copies inside Europe. The album includes the singles "If Tomorrow Never Comes", "I Love It When We Do", "We've Got Tonight", and "The Long Goodbye", all of which peaked inside the top ten of the UK Singles Chart.

Track listing

Personnel 

Tracie Ackerman – backing vocals
Gregg Alexander – producer, project coordinator
Rusty Anderson – electric guitar, bazouki
Dave Arch – piano, string arrangements
Liam Bradley – percussion, drums, backing vocals, producer
Maire Breatnach – violin
Danielle Brisebois – backing vocals
Alex Brown – backing vocals
Chris Brown – engineer
Sue Ann Carwell – backing vocals
Ed Colman – engineer
Dave Dale – engineer
Corinne Day – photography
Graham Dominy – assistant engineer
Aiden Foley – assistant engineer
Denny Fongheiser – percussion, cymbals, tom-tom
Daniel Frampton – mixing
Angie Giles – backing vocals
Jem Godfrey – producer
Eddie Hession – accordion, accordion arranger
Ash Howes – mixing
Rob Jacobs – engineer
Charles Judge – piano, keyboards, engineer, digital editing, sound design, pro-tools
Kieran Kiely – piano, organ (hammond)
Greg Kurstin – keyboards
Tim Lambert – assistant engineer
Chris Laws – drums, engineer
Steve Lee – backing vocals
Bob Ludwig – mastering
Lulu – vocals
Steve Mac – arranger, keyboards, producer, mixing
Calum MacColl – guitar, backing vocals, producer
Avril MacKintosh – producer, engineer, digital editing, remixing, vocal producer, pro-tools
Tony Matthew – assistant engineer
Alastair McMillan – engineer
James McNally – piano, bodhran
Kieron Menzies – assistant engineer
Crystal Murden – backing vocals
Yoad Nevo – programming
Rick Nowels – acoustic guitar, piano, keyboards, backing vocals, producer, mellotron, wurlitzer
Bill Padley – arranger, backing vocals, multi instruments, producer, musician
Pino Palladino – bass, bass guitar
Steve Pearce – bass guitar
John Pierce – bass
Tim Pierce – electric guitar
Daniel Pursey – assistant engineer
Wayne Rodrigues – drums, keyboards, digital editing, drum programming
Philip Rose – assistant engineer
Alfie Silas – backing vocals
Jess Sutcliffe – engineer
Shari Sutcliffe – project coordinator
John Themis – guitar, percussion, bazouki
Julie Thompson – backing vocals
Paul Turner – bass, guitar
Alan Veucasovic – assistant engineer
Dan Vickers – assistant engineer
Dave Way – mixing
Jeremy Wheatley – mixing
Randy Wine – engineer
Tim Young – mastering, mastering engineer

Charts and certifications

Weekly charts

Year-end charts

Certifications

References

External links

2002 albums
Ronan Keating albums
Albums produced by Rick Nowels
Polydor Records albums